1st to Die is a 2001 crime novel by American author James Patterson that is the first book in the Women's Murder Club series. The series is about four friends who pool their skills together to crack San Francisco's toughest murder cases. The women each have different jobs: Lindsay Boxer, a homicide inspector for the San Francisco Police Department, Claire Washburn, a medical examiner, Jill Bernhardt, an assistant D.A., and Cindy Thomas, a reporter who just started working the crime desk of the San Francisco Chronicle.

Plot summary
The prologue introduces the main character Inspector Lindsay Boxer, San Francisco P.D., who is in a depression and holding a gun to her head as a result of losing a love interest in a case called "The Honeymoon Murders".

Book One begins with David and Melanie Brandt, freshly married, in their hotel room at the Grand Hyatt. A man outside the door calls "Champagne" and David opens the door. The man, Phillip Campbell, then violently kills the bride and groom and immorally brutalizes the corpse of Melanie. The book then cuts to Inspector Lindsay Boxer in her general practitioner's office. The doctor, Dr. Roy Orenthaler, tells Lindsay that she has a rare, and deadly, blood disease called Negli's aplastic anemia. Throughout the book, Lindsay struggles with the physical side-effects of getting blood transfusions for Negli's and the emotional aspect of having a life-threatening disease. During the appointment, she is called to the crime scene of a double murder at the Grand Hyatt. In that scene she is introduced to Cindy Thomas, covering the story. The second pair of bodies are found, and after Lindsay is told she has a new partner due to the sensitivity of the case, Cindy, Lindsay, and medical examiner Claire Washburn join forces to attempt to solve the case.

The 3rd pair of bodies are found in Cleveland, Ohio, which are thought to be connected to the San Francisco cases. As Lindsay and company go through the case they acquire a fourth friend, Assistant D.A. Jill Bernhardt. Together, the four friends attempt to pin down a suspect, leading to the shocking conclusion. A subplot features Lindsay's attraction to Chris Raleigh, her new partner.

Reception
Kirkus Reviews stated the novel has "bargain-basement plotting, fewer thrills than a tax audit, and cardboard sleuths poised to return for a sequel."

Film adaptation
In 2003, the novel was adapted into a television film, First to Die, starring Tracy Pollan, Carly Pope, Megan Gallagher, Pam Grier, Gil Bellows, Robert Patrick and Sean Young among others.

References

External links
 

2001 American novels
Women's Murder Club (novel series)
Little, Brown and Company books